The 9th District of the Iowa Senate is located in southwestern Iowa, and is currently composed of Crawford, Harrison, Ida, Monona, Shelby, and Woodbury Counties.

Current elected officials
Jason Schultz is the senator currently representing the 9th District.

The area of the 9th District contains two Iowa House of Representatives districts:
The 17th District (represented by Matt Windschitl)
The 18th District (represented by Steven Holt)

The district is also located in Iowa's 4th congressional district, which is represented by U.S. Representative Randy Feenstra.

Past senators
The district has previously been represented by:

Dale L. Tieden, 1981-1982
Ray Taylor, 1983-1994
Stewart Iverson, 1995-2002
Bob Brunkhorst, 2003-2006
Bill Heckroth, 2007-2010
Bill Dix, 2011-2012
Nancy Boettger, 2013-2014
Jason Schultz, 2015-present

See also
Iowa General Assembly
Iowa Senate

References

09